14789 GAISh, provisional designation , is a dark background asteroid from the outer regions of the asteroid belt, approximately  in diameter. It was discovered on 8 October 1969, by Soviet astronomer Lyudmila Chernykh of the Crimean Astrophysical Observatory at Nauchnij, on the Crimean peninsula. The assumed C-type asteroid has a rotation period of 8.1 hours and possibly an elongated shape. It was named for the Russian Sternberg Astronomical Institute (GAISh) of Moscow State University.

Orbit and classification 

GAISh is a non-family asteroid from the main belt's background population. It orbits the Sun in the outer asteroid belt at a distance of 2.8–3.4 AU once every 5 years and 6 months (2,016 days; semi-major axis of 3.12 AU). Its orbit has an eccentricity of 0.09 and an inclination of 6° with respect to the ecliptic. The body's observation arc begins with its official discovery observation in October 1969.

Physical characteristics 

GAISh is an assumed carbonaceous C-type asteroid.

Rotation period 

In October 2010, a rotational lightcurve of GAISh was obtained from photometric observations in the R-band by astronomers at the Palomar Transient Factory in California. Lightcurve analysis gave a rotation period of 8.086 hours with a high brightness amplitude of 0.82 magnitude, indicative of a non-spherical shape.

Diameter and albedo 

According to the survey carried out by the NEOWISE mission of NASA's Wide-field Infrared Survey Explorer, GAISh measures 15.256 kilometers in diameter and its surface has an albedo of 0.076. The Collaborative Asteroid Lightcurve Link assumes a standard albedo for a carbonaceous asteroid of 0.057 and calculates a diameter of 11.42 kilometers based on an absolute magnitude of 13.44.

Naming 

This minor planet was named after the Sternberg Astronomical Institute (GAISh, ГАИШ), a division of Moscow State University. Founded in 1931, it is one of Russia's leading astronomical institute and a principal educational facility for professional astronomers. The institute is located on the site of the 1931-built Sternberg Observatory. The official naming citation was published by the Minor Planet Center on 6 January 2007.

References

External links 
 Asteroid Lightcurve Database (LCDB), query form (info )
 Dictionary of Minor Planet Names, Google books
 Discovery Circumstances: Numbered Minor Planets (10001)-(15000) – Minor Planet Center
 
 

014789
Discoveries by Lyudmila Chernykh
Named minor planets
19691008